Walter Tuchman led the Data Encryption Standard development team at IBM. He was also responsible for the development of Triple DES.

References

See also
 Horst Feistel

IBM employees
Modern cryptographers
Living people
Year of birth missing (living people)